The Kreutzer Sonata is a lost 1915 American silent romantic drama film directed by Herbert Brenon and costarring Nance O'Neil, Theda Bara, and William H. Shay. The film was based on the 1902 play of the same name by Jacob Gordin, which was based on Leo Tolstoy's 1889 novella. Produced by Fox Film Corporation, it was shot at the  company's studio in Fort Lee, New Jersey.

Cast
 Nance O'Neil as Miriam Friedlander
 Theda Bara as Celia Friedlander
 William E. Shay as Gregor Randar
 Mimi Yvonne
 Henry Bergman as Raphael Friedlander
 Sidney Cushing as G. Belushoff
 Maude Turner Gordon as Rebecca Friedlander
 John Daly Murphy as Sam Friedlander
 Anne Sutherland as Olga Belushoff

Reception
The Kreutzer Sonata was released two months after A Fool There Was, the first film that featured Theda Bara in the role of a femme fatale. Bara later confessed that she did not enjoy filming and was also dissatisfied that Fox had cast her in yet another "vamp" role. Despite Bara's dissatisfaction, she earned mostly good reviews for her performance and the film was a hit.

See also
1937 Fox vault fire

References

External links

1915 films
1915 romantic drama films
1915 lost films
Fox Film films
American romantic drama films
American silent feature films
American black-and-white films
American films based on plays
Films based on The Kreutzer Sonata
Films directed by Herbert Brenon
Films shot in Fort Lee, New Jersey
Lost American films
Lost romantic drama films
1910s American films
Silent romantic drama films
Silent American drama films
1910s English-language films